"Baby" is a song by Australian electronic house band Pnau. "Baby" was released on 3 March 2008 as the second single from the band's third studio album, Pnau (2007). The song peaked at number 34 on the Australian Singles Chart and became the band's first top-40 single.

At the ARIA Music Awards of 2008, the song was nominated for Best Video.

The song gained further attention in 2010, when the Breakbot remix of the song was added into the video game Gran Turismo 5 as the music that plays after a race.

In 2013, French electronic duo Faul & Wad Ad released "Changes" which samples the refrain from "Baby".

In 2015, the song was listed at number 38 in In the Mix's "100 Greatest Australian Dance Tracks of All Time" with Lachlan Kanoniuk said "'Baby' stands as a cute, humble artefact from the weird and wonderful indie dance explosion of the mid-to-late 2000s".

Track listing
CD single
 "Baby"   	
 "Baby"  	
 "Baby"  		
 "Wild Strawberries"

Charts

Release history

References

2007 songs
2008 singles
Pnau songs
Songs written by Nick Littlemore
Songs written by Peter Mayes
Songs written by Sam Littlemore